Pillapalu is a village in Anija Parish, Harju County, Estonia.  

Soodla reservoir and several big bogs are located in the village.

As of 1 August 2020, the village had a population of 94.

References

Villages in Harju County